Michael Warren "Mike" Cruz, M.D. (born September 8, 1958) is a Guamanian surgeon and former politician who served as the 8th Lieutenant Governor of Guam from January 1, 2007 to January 3, 2011.

Biography

Personal life
Cruz was born on September 8, 1958, where he raised in Agat, Guam by his parents Miguel de Gracia Cruz and Rosalinda Quinata. His father was Chamorro while his mother was Filipino.

He has three children from his first marriage: Shaunn, Mika’ele and Christine. Cruz is currently married to his second wife, Jennifer Rosario Cruz.  The couple have two daughters, Taylor & Bella, as well as Rosario Cruz's son, Christian, from her previous relationship.

Cruz received a bachelor's degree in biology from Walla Walla College in Washington state. He obtained a Doctor of Medicine from Loma Linda University in California.

Military
Cruz is a colonel in the Guam Army National Guard. He is a veteran of Operation Desert Storm. Cruz volunteered as a commander in the Rapid Advanced Medical Team during the Iraq War, serving from 2003 to 2004. He was a recipient of Bronze Star Medal for his tour of duty in Iraq.

Medical career
Cruz is a surgeon, and served as the medical director of the Guam Memorial Hospital. He is a member of the American Board of Surgery, and the American Society of Breast Surgeons, and a Fellow of the American College of Surgeons.

Political career
Cruz was elected as a Republican Senator in the 28th Guamanian Legislature from 2005 to 2006. He served on the legislature's Health and Human Services Committee, authoring legislation to combat childhood obesity in Guam.

He was elected Lieutenant Governor of Guam in November 2006 as the running mate of Governor Felix Perez Camacho. Cruz took office on January 1, 2007.

Cruz-Espaldon Campaign
Cruz declared his candidacy for the 2010 gubernatorial election and was a candidate in the September 2010 Republican primary. His running mate for lieutenant governor was Senator Jim Espaldon. Cruz was defeated by Eddie Baza Calvo in the Republican primary election on September 3, 2010.

See also 
 Carlotta A. Leon Guerrero

References

External links

Biography

1958 births
Chamorro people
Guam National Guard personnel
Guamanian people of Filipino descent
Guamanian physicians
Guamanian Republicans
Lieutenant Governors of Guam
Living people
Loma Linda University alumni
Members of the Legislature of Guam
National Guard (United States) colonels
United States Army personnel of the Gulf War
United States Army personnel of the Iraq War
Walla Walla University alumni